An Act of Valour is a 2010 short film and the directorial debut by the English actor Allan Corduner. It was written by Juha Leppäjärvi, and produced by Janet Sate for Caravanserai Productions. The film premiered at the 24th BFI London Lesbian and Gay Film Festival in March 2010.

Synopsis
A London gay couple, Kevin and Will, face a grim morning after anxiously waiting for the next news broadcast. At a police station, Detective Sergeant Russell is trying to pacify Lisa, whose boyfriend seems to be missing. There's a body on a nearby common.

Cast

Juha Leppäjärvi as Kevin
Henry Blake as Will
Marcus D'Amico as DS Russell
Victoria Bavister as Lisa
Gerard Monaco as Jeremy
Dorian Black (aka Dusty Limits) as Bette Noir
Kristin McIlquham as PC Harris.

Writer and actor Juha Leppäjärvi, aka Juha Sorola, developed the script at Caravanserai Acting Studio, of which he is one of the founding members and Allan Corduner, directed it.

References 

1. http://www.caravanseraiproductions.com

External links 
 
 

British drama short films
British LGBT-related films
2010 crime drama films
British crime drama films
LGBT-related drama films
LGBT-related short films
Gay-related films
2010 films
2010 LGBT-related films
2010s British films